The 2009 Sporting Cristal season is the 54th season of the team's existence. Sporting Cristal finished 10th overall in the Aggregate table and did not qualify for either the Copa Libertadores or the Copa Sudamericana.

Squad

First-team squad
As of August 2009.

Transfers

In

Out

Out on loan

Club

Management

Other information

Peruvian Primera División

First stage

Standings

Results summary

Second stage
The Second Stage will begin on September 13 where the 16 teams will be divided into two groups and play a total of 14 home-and-away fixtures. Each winner will qualify for the Copa Libertadores 2009 Second Stage.

Standings

Aggregate table
The aggregate table will determine the third and last team to qualify to the 2010 Copa Libertadores, the three who qualify to the 2010 Copa Sudamericana, and the two teams to be relegated to the Segunda División. The aggregate table consists of the points earned in the First and Second stages.

Matches

First Stage

Second Stage

2009 Copa Libertadores

Estudiantes advances on away goals.

References

External links 
2009 Schedule

2009
Sporting Cristal